The 1949–50 season saw Rochdale compete for their 22nd season in the Football League Third Division North.

Statistics
																												
								
								
								
								
								
								
								
								
								
								
								
								
								
								
								
								
								
								
								
								
								
|}

Final league table

Competitions

Football League Third Division North

F.A. Cup

Lancashire Cup

References

Rochdale A.F.C. seasons
Rochdale